Stenhammar is a Swedish surname.

Notable people
Notable people with this surname include:
Christian Stenhammar (1783–1866), Swedish priest and botanist
Ernst Stenhammar (1859–1927), Swedish architect
Fredrika Stenhammar (1836–1880), Swedish soprano
 (1769–1799), Swedish poet
 (1829–1875), Swedish architect
Wilhelm Stenhammar (1871–1927), Swedish composer

See also
Stenhammar Palace